Húsavíkurhöfði Tunnel (regionally also ), also known as Bakki Tunnel is a road tunnel in Húsavík, Iceland. It connects the town's port with a nearby industrial area and is closed to the public.

References

Road tunnels in Iceland
Tunnels completed in 2017
Buildings and structures in Northeastern Region (Iceland)